Protasio Tagle was a Mexican soldier and politician who lived in the 19th century. He participated in the Reform War as a member of the liberal sector, and later led a republican division during the second French intervention in Mexico. He joined general Porfirio Díaz during the Revolution of Tuxtepec (see Plan de Tuxtepec) and, after Díaz won and became the president of Mexico, Tagle was appointed as the Secretary of the Interior. In 1879 there were possibilities for him to be the presidential candidate, but he was defeated by Manuel González and finally retired from political activities.

Mexican soldiers
History of Mexico
Porfiriato
19th-century Mexican people
Year of birth missing
Year of death missing
Mexican Secretaries of the Interior